Kudō Suketsune (Japanese: 工藤 祐経; 1147 – June 28, 1193) was a samurai and gokenin in the late Heian and early Kamakura period. He is known for having been assassinated during the Revenge of the Soga Brothers incident.

Life 
Suketsune was born in 1147 as the son of Kudō Suketsugu.

According to Azuma Kagami, when Suketsune had his coming of age ceremony (genpuku), Suketsugu promised that Suketsune would marry Mangō Gozen, the daughter of Itō Sukechika, and Sukechika would become Suketsune's guardian. However, Sukechika did not accept the fact that Suketsune, not in the lineage of the eldest son, would inherit the manor, and invaded Suketsune's territory following Suketsugu's death. Sukechika also made Mangō Gozen, who was married to Suketsune, divorce him.

Suketsune was deeply angered over these events and ordered the assassination of Sukechika. In October 1176, a group of thugs attacked Sukechika, who was hunting in Okuno, Izu Province with his son Kawazu Sukeyasu. The arrow shot at Sukechika missed, and hit Sukeyasu instead, killing him.

In 1193, Suketsune participated in shogun Minamoto no Yoritomo's large-scale hunting event, Fuji no Makigari, at the foot of Mount Fuji. At midnight on June 28, the final day of the hunting event, two brothers, Soga Sukenari and Tokimune, broke into the building where Suketsune and two prostitutes were resting. The two brothers killed Suketsune as a revenge for their father's death. Ōtōnai, a shinkan of Kibitsu Shrine in Bizen Province, was also killed in the process. After this, Sukenari was killed by Suketsune's retainer Nitta Tadatsune, and Tokimune was captured by Gosho no Gorōmaru after an assassination attempt on the shogun. After the turmoil, Yoritomo, who had questioned Soga Tokimune, considered saving his life, but Suketsune's son Inubusamaru (later Itō Suketoki) cried pleading for justice, and Yoritomo changed his mind and had Tokimune executed. This incident came to be known as the Revenge of the Soga Brothers.

See also 

 Revenge of the Soga Brothers
 Kawazu Sukeyasu
 Fuji no Makigari

References 

Samurai
1147 births
1193 deaths
12th-century Japanese people
People of Heian-period Japan
People of Kamakura-period Japan